Cold rubber, or cold polymerized rubber, is synthetic rubber (especially, SBR and NBR) emulsion polymerized at a relatively low temperature.

The polymerizing temperature is approximately 5°C in the case of SBR and 5~10°C in the case of NBR. 
Since rubber molecule types have a smaller number of branches than hot rubber polymerized at high temperature (50°C) and are characterized by good stereoregularity, cold rubber has superior processability as well as the ability to produce vulcanized materials with good tensile strength, expansion and aging resistance, and flex resistance.

Except some SBR and NBR used for special purposes, most SBR and NBR available in the market are considered cold rubber.

Rubber
Elastomers